The Wildheart Sanctuary, previously known as the Isle of Wight Zoo and Sandown Zoo, is a sanctuary inside the former Sandown Fort on the coastline of Sandown, Isle of Wight. The zoo was privately owned but became a charitable trust in 2017. The collection focuses principally on big cats and Madagascan animals.

As part of the European Endangered Species Programme, the zoo has had success breeding several species of Madagascan animals including the critically endangered black-and-white ruffed lemur.

History

Originally known as Sandown Zoo, the zoo was established in the 1950s. By the 1970s it had fallen into disrepair, and was dubbed "The Slum Zoo of Britain" by The Sunday Times. However in 1976 the zoo was taken over by a new owner, Jack Corney, and over the following years it was rebuilt as a sanctuary for big cats and primates. Since Corney died in 2003 the zoo has been run by his daughter Charlotte. In 2017, Charlotte established the Wildheart Trust, making the Isle of Wight Zoo a registered charity.<ref name= "wildhearttrust" / It was subsequently renamed the Wildheart Sanctuary in 2021.<ref name="wildheartsanctuary"/

Main species

Big cats

The zoo is currently home to three tigers and four African lions. It has recently rescued five tigers from a circus in southern Spain. 

In recent years three Indian-themed enclosures have opened featuring glass viewing panels, ponds, natural planting and themed statues and temples. These enclosures were designed and built with the assistance of Ecclestone George Public Artists.

Between 2016 and December 2019 the zoo was home to a tiger called Simi who had been rescued from a circus in Germany. Simi died in December 2019, according to the zoo owing to problems caused by her time in the circus.

Additionally, the zoo has recently taken in three Eurasian lynx.

Primates

The zoo also has a Madagascan theme, and the primate section reflects this by specialising in lemurs. It houses ring-tailed, black-and-white ruffed, red ruffed, black,  white-fronted brown lemurs and mongoose lemurs, several of which have bred in recent years as part of European breeding programmes.<ref name= "iowzoolemurssection" /

The primate section is also home to spider monkeys, capuchins, vervet monkeys and common marmosets.<ref name= "iowzoomonkeyssection" /

Conservation

The zoo currently funds two conservation projects, both related to its areas of special interest.

The principal project is 'Local Advocacy for Tiger Conservation in Bhadra-Kudremukh Tiger Landscape'. This project is administered by the charity Global Tiger Patrol and funded wholly by the zoo. Over the year 2010/11 the zoo's contribution was £10800. In November 2011 the project won the BIAZA award for Best Conservation Project (Small Collection).

The second project focuses on Madagascar and is administered by the Madagascar Fauna Group. As a sponsoring member the Isle of Wight Zoo contributes $5000 annually. The zoo sponsors an agroforestry station aimed at teaching alternative farming methods to the destructive slash-and-burn techniques commonly used.

Filming

The zoo was the subject and main filming location for the ITV Meridian television programme Tiger Island. Two series were filmed, showing different aspects of zoo life including making enrichment toys and designing new enclosures.
A film was in production giving a behind-the-scenes view of the zoo and was to be ready in August 2013.

References

External links

Isle of Wight Zoo website
Tiger Island television program description

Tourist attractions on the Isle of Wight
Zoos in England
1950s establishments in England
Buildings and structures on the Isle of Wight
Sandown